Gundappa Korwar is an Indian politician. He was a Member of Parliament, representing Karnataka in the Rajya Sabha the upper house of India's Parliament as a member of the Indian National Congress.

References

Rajya Sabha members from Karnataka
1939 births
2003 deaths
Indian National Congress politicians